Yarraville Football Club was an Australian rules football club founded in 1903 and played in the VJFA until 1927. In 1928, the club joined the Victorian Football Association where it played until 1984 when the club went into recess. In 1996, the Kingsville Football Club in the Western Region Football League who by this time had taken over the Yarraville ground changed their name to Yarraville. In 2007 the Yarraville Football Club merged with the Seddon Football Club to become the Yarraville Seddon Eagles.

History

The VJFA years (1903–1927)
Yarraville Football Club was formed on April 1, 1903. It then joined the Victorian Junior Football Association, where it was highly successful. Between 1905 and 1913, the club missed the Grand Final only once, and won a total of four premierships: in 1905, 1908, 1909 and 1912. The 1912 premiership came after a controversial final: Yarraville had lost to Port Melbourne Railway United by three points, but protested that the goal umpire had erred in awarding one of Railway's goals in the second quarter; the protest was upheld and the game was awarded to Yarraville. Railway was the minor premier and still had the right to challenge for the premiership, but declined to challenge as its own act of protest, resulting in Yarraville winning the premiership.

Yarraville won three more premierships during its time in the association – in 1920, and back-to-back in 1925 and 1926. Overall, it won seven premierships – the most of any club in the Association's history – and finished runners up six times in its 25 years in the competition. It was also the only two-time outright winner of the John Wren Shield, a perpetual premiership trophy which was awarded annually to the VJFA premiers, then permanently to the first team to win it three times; the club received the shield in 1909 and 1926.

The VFA years (1928–1984)
Yarraville joined the VFA senior competition in 1928. Prior to the season, the club merged with the neighbouring VJFA rival, the Kingsville Football Club. In 1935 the club won its first VFA grand final. Its next VFA grand final win was in 1961 the same year the VFA added a division 2. By the mid 70s the club had been relegated to the 2nd division and in 1976 finished last on the ladder. The club struggled for support in Division 2, and in the mid-1970s when Association-wide crowds were averaging more than 4,500, Yarraville still seldom drew more than 1,000 fans to games.

The club's on-field position improved in 1977 thanks to a big sponsorship deal, and Yarraville finished on top of the ladder, but was unable to win the grand final. Yarraville remained a top side in 2nd division until 1980, but its form deteriorated dramatically thereafter. The club moved from Yarraville Oval to Western Oval in 1983, but won only one game across all three grades in the season. Seeing no prospects for lasting viability, the VFA withdrew Yarraville's playing licence in January 1984.

The WRFL years (1996–2006) 
In 1996 The Kingsville Football Club changed its name to Yarraville. Kingsville had started playing at the Yarraville Oval several years earlier. The first game under the Yarraville name saw Yarraville lose to Parkside. However, after that Yarraville would win 15 out of 18 games in 1996 and take 1st place on the ladder. They made it to the Grand Final but would lose to Parkside. In 1997 Yarraville again took top spot and again took on Parkside in the Grand Final but this time were able to win the Flag. Yarraville's reserves team also won the grand final beating Parkside as well.

In 1998 Yarraville suffered after losing many of the players who had helped win the flags the previous year and would finish midway through the ladder. In 1999 Yarraville struggled and would only manage 4 wins for the season. They finished last and were relegated to the second division of the WRFL.

In 2000 Yarraville were able to rebuild and had probably the best team since the '97 grand final winning team. The club was determined to get back to division 1 where they felt they rightfully belonged. They won all but one game for the season and often won by margins of 20-30 goals. On 15 July Yarraville kicked 55 goals and 33 behinds against the struggling Brooklyn. Yarraville defeated Glenorden in the Grand final. The win put Yarraville back into 1st division for the following season.

From 2001 to 2006 Yarraville maintained its spot in 1st division and just missed out on playing finals several times. During the 2006 season Yarraville began talks about a possible merger with the Seddon Football Club. Seddon had dropped out of the senior competition after 10 games due to poor performance. The merger was eventually agreed upon. The Yarraville football club played its final game at the end of the 2006 season when they defeated St Albans.

Although this marked the end of the Yarraville Football Club. 2007 marked the beginning of the Yarraville Seddon Eagles Football Club. A combination of the Yarraville Football Club, Seddon Football Club and Yarraville Juniors.

Premierships
Victorian Football League  (2): 1935, 1961
Western Region Football League
 Division One (3): 1943, 1964 ,1997
 Division Two (4): 1942, 1971, 1977 as Kingsville, 2000

Notes

References 

Western Region Football League clubs
Former Victorian Football League clubs
1903 establishments in Australia
2007 disestablishments in Australia
Australian rules football clubs established in 1903
Australian rules football clubs disestablished in 2007
Australian rules football clubs in Melbourne